The Chaparral Center is a multi-purpose indoor arena located on the campus of Midland College in Midland, Texas. It opened in 1978 and has a capacity of 5,500 people.

References

1978 establishments in Texas
Buildings and structures in Midland, Texas
Indoor arenas in Texas
Midland College